Ceylon spinach is a common name for several plants and may refer to:

Basella alba, native to tropical Asia and Africa
Talinum fruticosum